Solino is a 2002 Italian-German movie directed by Fatih Akın and starring Moritz Bleibtreu, Barnaby Metschurat, Gigi Savoia and Antonella Attili.

Plot
The movie portrays the story of an Italian family that emigrated to Germany in the 1960s. Romano (Gigi Savoia), the father, decides to open a pizzeria  which, by mutual decision with the wife Rosa (Antonella Attili), they call Solino, after their village in Abruzzo, Italy.  As they grow up, his sons Gigi and Giancarlo begin to work there. A hostile relationship comes to life between the father and his sons, which will end up in the forced departure of the boys from the family apartment.

The sons, Giancarlo and Gigi, move into an apartment which they share with their childhood friend Johanna.  Gigi and Johanna kindle a romance between them, to Giancarlo's dismay.  Meanwhile, things go wrong between their parents Romano and Rosa, prompting Rosa to move in with her sons and their roommate. Tension between the brothers becomes intense when Rosa, for health reasons, needs to return to Italy long-term.  One son must accompany her and neither wishes to, as it would leave Johanna to the other.

Cast

Notes
(1)http://movies.nytimes.com/movie/284376/Solino/overview
(2)http://www.timeout.com/film/reviews/74931/Solino.html
(3)https://web.archive.org/web/20080212224540/http://www.br-online.de/kultur-szene/film/kino/0308/00414/

External links
Official site

 

2002 films
Films set in West Germany
Films set in restaurants
German drama films
2002 drama films
Films directed by Fatih Akin
Films set in the 1960s
Films set in the 1970s
Films set in the 1980s
Fictional restaurants
Films about families
Films about immigration
Italian drama films
German multilingual films
Italian multilingual films
2000s German films